The Nikon F6 is a 35 mm film single-lens reflex camera body manufactured by Nikon between 2004 and 2020. It is the sixth film camera in Nikon's line. The Nikon F6 was designed by Nikon and was manufactured at their Sendai plant.

The F6 is the most recent model of Nikon's F series and was discontinued in October 2020. It replaced the Nikon F5, manufactured from 1996 to 2004. It can accept any Nikon F-mount lens with full metering functionality, discluding non-AI. At the time it was discontinued, the F6 was the last remaining film SLR still in production.

Camera features
 Focusing screen: B-type BriteView Clear Matte Screen II, interchangeable with six other optional focusing screens
 Viewfinder frame coverage: Approx. 100%
 Finder magnification: Approx. 0.74x with 50 mm lens set to infinity at -1.0m-1
 Autofocus: TTL phase detection, Nikon Multi-CAM2000 autofocus module
 Autofocus detection range: Approx. EV –1 to EV 19 (ISO 100, at normal temperature)
 Focus modes: Single Servo AF and Continuous Servo AF, and Manual
 Focus Tracking: Automatically activated in Single Servo AF or Continuous Servo AF
 Focus area: One — or a group — of 11 focus areas can be selected
 AF Area Modes: Single Area AF, Dynamic AF, Group Dynamic AF or Dynamic AF with Closest-Subject Priority selectable
 Focus lock: Focus is locked by pressing AE/AF-L button or lightly pressing shutter release button in Single Servo AF
 Exposure metering: Three built-in exposure meters — 3D Color Matrix, Center-Weighted and Spot
 Metering range (ISO 100, f/1.4 lens): EV 0 to EV 20 in 3D Color Matrix and Center-Weighted, EV 2 to EV 20 in Spot
 Exposure compensation: With exposure compensation button; ±5 EV range, in 1/3, 1/2 or 1 steps
 Auto Exposure Bracketing: Number of shots: 2-7; compensation steps: 1/3, 1/2, 2/3, or 1 EV steps
 Auto Exposure Lock: By pressing AE/AF-L button
 Film speed setting: DX or Manual selectable (manual setting has priority over DX detected film speed); DX: ISO 25-5000,
 Manual: ISO 6-6400 in 1/3 steps
 Shutter: Electronically controlled vertical-travel focal-plane shutter with built-in Shutter Monitor
 Shutter speeds: 30 to 1/8,000 s (1/3 steps in S and M modes); Bulb setting available in M mode (Shutter speed can be prolonged to 30 minutes in M mode)
 Accessory shoe: ISO518 hot-shoe contact digital data communication (sync contact, ready-light contact, TTL auto flash contact, monitor contact, GND), safety lock provided
 Sync contact: X-contact only; flash synchronization up to 1/250 s (up to 1/8,000 s possible in AUTO FP High-Speed Sync)
 Flash control: TTL flash control by combined five-segment TTL Multi Sensor with single-component IC and 1,005-pixel RGB sensor; i-TTL Balanced Fill-Flash with SB-800/600; Film speed range in TTL auto flash: ISO 25-1000
 Automatic film loading; automatic or manual film rewind

Design
 Die-cast camera chassis, rear and film cover made of aluminium alloy
 The front, top and bottom covers are made of magnesium alloy.
 Parts made out of magnesium-alloy use the thixomold process.
 Remote shutter release: 10-pin terminal
 Redesigned tilted control wheels, shutter button and larger buttons.
 Detachable vertical grip housing and external battery pack.
 MV-1 data reader accessory
 100% coverage viewfinder

References

External links

F006
F006